Maricely del Carmen González Pomares (born 28 February 1988 in Panama City, Panama) is a Panamanian model and beauty pageant contestant. She was the winner of the Miss Panama World 2012 title on 30 March 2012 for the Miss World 2012 contest.

Participation in contests
She participated in the competition for TV Nuestra Belleza Latina 2010 Univision where she managed to enter the group of 20.

In 2010, she participated in the Miss Tourism International 2010 in Malaysia. She ranked among the (top 20) semi-finalists.

Miss Panamá 2012

At the end of the Miss Panamá 2012 she also received awards including Miss Photogenic and Best National Costume.

González is 5 ft 8 in (1.73 m) tall, and she represented the state of Bocas del Toro.

Miss World 2012 

She represented Panama in the 62nd Miss World pageant, which was held in Ordos, Inner Mongolia, China on 18 August 2012. She placed among the top 30 finalists, after having placed in the top 10 of the Miss World Talent fast track.

Miss Continente Americano 2012
She represented Panama in the 7th annual contest of Miss Continente Americano in Guayaquil, Ecuador on 29 September 2012, where she placed as 1st runner-up.

See also
 Stephanie Vander Werf
 Miss Panamá 2012

References

External links
Panamá 2012 official website
Miss Panamá

1988 births
Living people
Panamanian beauty pageant winners
Panamanian female models
Miss World 2012 delegates
Señorita Panamá